Zhou Guanyu (pronounced ; born 30 May 1999) is a Chinese racing driver who currently competes in Formula One for Alfa Romeo. He is the first Chinese driver to compete in Formula One. He competed in the FIA Formula 2 Championship for UNI-Virtuosi Racing from 2019 to 2021, having finished 3rd in the 2021 campaign. 

A former member of the Alpine Academy, he served as the test driver for the Renault F1 Team and the Alpine F1 Team in 2020 and 2021 respectively. Prior to that, he was a member of the Ferrari Driver Academy from 2014 to 2018, and served as the development driver for Formula E team DS Techeetah in 2018.

Early career

Karting 
Having started karting when he was eight years old in China, Zhou moved to Sheffield in 2012 for a more competitive racing environment. In 2013 racing with the Sheffield-based Strawberry Racing team, he won both the Super 1 National Rotax Max Junior Championship and Rotax Max Euro Challenge. For his final year of karting, Zhou finished 2nd in the Rotax Max Senior Euro Challenge and participated in selected rounds of WSK Champions Cup and the KF2 European Championship. He also made his first and only appearance in the Karting World Championship, driving for Ricky Flynn Motorsport alongside Lando Norris and Jehan Daruvala.

Formula 4 
Zhou joined Prema Powerteam for the 2015 Italian F4 Championship. After winning all three races in Round 2 at Monza and consistently finishing on the podium, Zhou ended the season as vice-champion and best rookie. He also competed in selected rounds of the German ADAC F4 Championship, achieving two podium finishes in Spielberg and Spa.

FIA Formula 3 European Championship

2016 
Zhou joined team Motopark for the 2016 FIA European F3 Championship. After a successful season opener rounds in Paul Ricard and Hungaroring by finishing in 2 podium positions, Zhou struggled to find pace during the 2nd half of the season, finishing in 13th for his maiden season.

2017 
Zhou stayed for a second F3 season by rejoining Prema and improved to 8th in standings with 5 podium finishes. Season highlights included leading race 3 in Spa and holding back Lando Norris in the penultimate round.

2018 
After speculation of a possible move to F2, Zhou remained with Prema for a third F3 season. After a maiden career win in Pau, a podium in Hungaroring, and three consecutive podium finishes in Zandvoort, Zhou found him standing in 2nd, just a point behind teammate Marcus Armstrong. Despite a strong qualifying pace in Spa and Silverstone, Zhou suffered 4 consecutive retirements with a series of teammate collisions and tyre punctures. Zhou won his second F3 race in Hockenheim, finishing the season 8th in the standings, with 3 poles, and 2 wins.

FIA Formula 2

2019 
In December 2018, Zhou joined UNI-Virtuosi Racing along with Luca Ghiotto for the 2019 FIA Formula 2 Championship. Zhou achieved a maiden feature race podium in Barcelona after a strong qualifying and leading most of the race before dropping to third due to tyre degradation. He subsequently achieved another 3rd in the Monaco sprint race by overtaking Artem Markelov at the start. At Silverstone, Zhou scored his first Formula 2 pole position, becoming the first Chinese driver to do so. Later, Zhou also scored third place in the sprint race at Paul Ricard. In the feature race at Silverstone, he lost positions to his teammate and race winner Luca Ghiotto and the second-place driver Nicholas Latifi. In Abu Dhabi, he also finished third with the fastest lap in Race 1. He finished seventh in the championship and was subsequently awarded the Anthoine Hubert Award for being the highest-finishing rookie.

2020 
Zhou remained at UNI-Virtuosi for the 2020 season, partnering Ferrari Driver Academy member Callum Ilott. Zhou took his second Formula 2 pole position at the opening race at the Red Bull Ring. However, his car suffered electronic problems whilst leading the feature race, causing him to drop to 17th. Later in the year, Zhou won his first Formula 2 race in Sochi, after Aitken and Ghiotto crashed at lap 5 of the sprint race, causing a premature end of the race. Over the season, Zhou achieved 6 podiums and finished sixth in the championship.

2021 

Zhou entered his third F2 season staying with UNI-Virtuosi and partnering Felipe Drugovich. He took pole position in the opening round at Bahrain and converted the pole to his first feature race win in F2. The Chinese driver took another victory in the first sprint race in Monaco ahead of his team-mate Drugovich. However, after another podium in Baku, Zhou went four races without scoring points, with a brake failure and a resulting collision with Dan Ticktum in the first lap of the second race in Azerbaijan and a spin in the first sprint race at Silverstone allowing fellow academy member Oscar Piastri to take the lead in the standings. Zhou broke his duck by taking his third victory of the season in the feature race in Britain, beating out Ticktum for the victory. At the following round in Monza Zhou was able to end up on the podium twice, losing out to Théo Pourchaire and Piastri in races one and three respectively. Unfortunately for the Chinese driver, he stalled his car following a spin before the first race in Sochi and only managed to finish the feature race in sixth place, thus losing more ground to leader Piastri, who went into the penultimate round with a 36-point advantage. In Round 7 at Jeddah, he dropped to third in the standings after a spin caused by colliding with Christian Lundgaard in the first sprint race. He bounced back in the final round at Abu Dhabi, signing off his F2 career by winning the second sprint race and finishing second in the feature race. He finished the season third in the championship, having achieved 4 wins, 1 pole and 9 podiums.

F3 Asian Championship 
During the winter break before the start of the 2021 Formula 2 season, Zhou participated in the 2021 F3 Asian Championship driving for Abu Dhabi Racing by Prema. He won the championship after achieving 4 wins, 5 poles and 11 podiums in the season.

Formula One 
In 2014, Zhou joined the Ferrari Driver Academy while competing in karting. He left the academy at the end of 2018 and joined the Renault Sport Academy the following year ahead of his move into Formula 2. He served as a development driver for the Renault F1 Team in 2019 and took part in an R.S.17 testing programme, driving at five different circuits during the year. He was promoted to the role of Test Driver in 2020. He participated in the Virtual Grand Prix Series—an esports competition organised by Formula One in place of races postponed or cancelled due to the COVID-19 pandemic—and won the first race held at the Bahrain International Circuit. Once the  season resumed, Zhou took part in three test sessions driving the Renault R.S.18, including the post-season test at Yas Marina Circuit alongside Fernando Alonso. This made him the second driver from Mainland China to participate in a race weekend after Ma Qinghua.

Alfa Romeo (2022–)

2022 

Zhou signed with Alfa Romeo for the  Formula One season, partnering Valtteri Bottas and becoming China's first Formula One race driver. In a press release following the announcement, Zhou stated that he was "well prepared for the immense challenge of Formula 1" and that his entry into the series would be "a breakthrough for Chinese motorsport history". He chose 24 as his permanent racing number to honour his sporting hero Kobe Bryant, who wore the number during his basketball career with the Los Angeles Lakers.

Seven races without points followed. A collision with Pierre Gasly eliminated him from the  sprint, which was followed by mechanical retirements at the Miami and Spanish Grands Prix. A hydraulics issue at the  caused his third retirement in four races. He was extracted and taken to the medical centre, and then declared fit after being observed. Zhou later commented that the halo saved his life during the crash.

He finished sixteenth at the rain-shortened , but a late pit stop for new tyres allowed him to claim the fastest lap for the first time in his career. Zhou ended the season eighteenth in the World Drivers' Championship with 6 points to teammate Bottas' 49.

2023 
Zhou remained with Alfa Romeo for  alongside Bottas. During the second day of pre-season testing at the Bahrain International Circuit, he set the fastest lap time of 1:31.610. Alfa Romeo later explained that this was done to deny rivals Alpine and ninth-placed Pierre Gasly the bonus point.

Karting record

Karting career summary

Racing record

Racing career summary 

 Season still in progress.

Complete Italian F4 Championship results 
(key) (Races in bold indicate pole position) (Races in italics indicate fastest lap)

Complete ADAC Formula 4 Championship results 
(key) (Races in bold indicate pole position) (Races in italics indicate fastest lap)

Complete Toyota Racing Series results 
(key) (Races in bold indicate pole position) (Races in italics indicate fastest lap)

Complete FIA Formula 3 European Championship results
(key) (Races in bold indicate pole position) (Races in italics indicate fastest lap)

Complete Macau Grand Prix results

Complete FIA Formula 2 Championship results
(key) (Races in bold indicate pole position points) (Races in italics indicate fastest lap points)

‡ Half points awarded as less than 75% of race distance was completed.

Complete F3 Asian Championship results
(key) (Races in bold indicate pole position) (Races in italics indicate fastest lap)

Complete Formula One results 
(key) (Races in bold indicate pole position) (Races in italics indicate fastest lap)

 Did not finish, but was classified as he had completed more than 90% of the race distance.
 Season still in progress.

References

External links

 
 
 Guanyu Zhou on Weibo
 Profile at ferrari.com
 Profile at renaultsport.com



1999 births
Living people
Chinese racing drivers
Chinese Formula One drivers
Italian F4 Championship drivers
Toyota Racing Series drivers
ADAC Formula 4 drivers
FIA Formula 3 European Championship drivers
FIA Formula 2 Championship drivers
F3 Asian Championship drivers
Prema Powerteam drivers
M2 Competition drivers
Motopark Academy drivers
Virtuosi Racing drivers
Alfa Romeo Formula One drivers
Karting World Championship drivers
Chinese expatriate sportspeople in England